Progress M-59, identified by NASA as Progress 24P, was a Progress spacecraft used to resupply the International Space Station. It was a Progress-M 11F615A55 spacecraft, with the serial number 359.

Launch
Progress M-59 was launched by a Soyuz-U carrier rocket from Site 1/5 at the Baikonur Cosmodrome. Launch occurred at 02:12:13 UTC on 18 January 2007.

Docking
The spacecraft docked with the Pirs module at 01:59 UTC on 20 January 2007. It remained docked for 193 days before undocking at 14:07 UTC on 1 August 2007. It was deorbited at 18:42 UTC the same day. The spacecraft burned up in the atmosphere over the Pacific Ocean, with any remaining debris landing in the ocean at around 19:26 UTC.

Progress M-59 carried supplies to the International Space Station, including food, water and oxygen for the crew and equipment for conducting scientific research. Its cargo included components for the Space Station's life support system.

See also

 List of Progress flights
 Uncrewed spaceflights to the International Space Station

References

Spacecraft launched in 2007
Progress (spacecraft) missions
Spacecraft which reentered in 2007
Supply vehicles for the International Space Station
Spacecraft launched by Soyuz-U rockets